Recordando Otra Vez is the twenty-sixth album released by Christian singer Marcos Witt. The album was recorded live from Los Angeles, California and was winner of the Latin Grammy in the Category of Best Christian album. As of October 5, 2007, the album has been certified Platinum by the RIAA.

Track listing
"Cantando Alegre Seguiré" - 03:57
"Que Lindo Es Mí Cristo" - 03:57
"Súplica" (Featuring Gadiel Espinoza) - 05:42
"América Será Para Cristo" - 03:13
"Oh, Jesús Creo En Ti" - 05:15
"Quiero Cantar Una Linda Canción" - 03:20
"Peña De Horeb" (Featuring Ralphy Rodríguez) - 02:51
"Usa Mí Vida" (Featuring Gadiel Espinoza) - 04:25
"Travesia Magica" (Acoustic By Liuba Maria Hevia) - 01:32
"Bendice Hoy" (Featuring Vicente Motaño) - 04:43
"Solamente En Cristo" - 01:17
"Sólo Dios Hace Al Hombre Feliz" - 00:55
"Vamos Orando" - 01:11
"Siento El Fuego" - 01:42
"El Viajero" - 03:33
"Te Tengo A Tí" - 05:11
"Ayer, Hoy Y Siempre" - 04:39
"He Decidido Seguir A Cristo" - 05:24
"Te Vengo A Decir" - 03:06
"Yo Te Busco" (Bonus Track) - 04:00

Awards

In 2005, the album was nominated for a Dove Award for Spanish Album of the Year at the 36th GMA Dove Awards.

Credits

Producers: 
 Juan Salinas  
 Marcos Witt  

Executive producer:
 Marcos Witt
 Alfonso Ortiz - Executive Director 

Arrangers:
 Wiso Aponte  
 Mike Casteel 
 Isaac Escamilla  
 Holger Fath  
 Joseph Garcia  
 Jay Henry 
 Russell Mauldin 
 Chris McDonald 
 Steven Monárrez  
 Buddy Skipper  

Worship leader: 
 Marcos Witt

Musicians:
 Alex Acuña - percussion
 Randall Gonzalez - drums
 Holger Fath - electric guitar, acoustic guitar
 Randy Allison - saxophone
 Emmanuel Espinosa - bass, acoustic guitar
 The Nashville String Machine - strings
 Wiso Aponte - electric guitar, acoustic guitar
 Isaac Escamilla - keyboards]
 Jacob Garcia - sax (bass)
 Joseph Garcia accordion, upright bass
 Jay Henry - trombone
 Bob Martin - trumpet
 David Moreno - soloist, trumpet

Vocalists:
 Adriana Escamilla - vocals 
 Gadiel Espinoza - vocals, guest appearance
 Vicente Montaño - vocals, guest appearance 
 Ralphy Rodriguez - vocals guest appearance 
 Nolita Theo - vocals 
 Coalo Zamorano - vocals, guest appearance

Engineer:
 Orlando Rodriguez - engineer, mixing
 Héctor Sotelo - cover design 
 Eddie Sakaki - photography 
 Dick Tunney music advisor

Sales and certifications

References

2004 live albums
Marcos Witt live albums
Latin Grammy Award for Best Christian Album (Spanish Language)